Sobrecastell is a locality located in the municipality of Arén, in Huesca province, Aragon, Spain. As of 2020, it has a population of 27.

Geography 
Sobrecastell is located 133km east of Huesca.

References

Populated places in the Province of Huesca